Josef Mikl (August 8, 1929 – March 29, 2008) was an Austrian abstract painter of the Informal style.

Biography
Born in Vienna, he received his first training at the Graphische Lehr- und Versuchsanstalt, studying at the prominent Viennese academy from 1949 to 1956 under Josef Dobrovský. Collaborating with Friedensreich Hundertwasser at the Vienna Art Club, Mikl later was a member of the Galerie St. Stephan group. In 1968 Mikl, well known in Austria, represented his home country at the 34th Biennale in Venice.

Classified as an Informal and Modernist artist, Mikl himself despised his artwork being placed under a specific label, calling it "an insult" in an undated interview. He worked in oil, pastels and water colors, as well as sculptures and drawings that either stood alone or served as illustrations in a book or decorations in a church. Mikl is best known for renovating the Redoutensaal in Vienna's Imperial Palace after it was destroyed in a 1992 fire. The hall once served as a venue for the first performance of Ludwig van Beethoven's 8th Symphony as well as a summit between U.S. President John F. Kennedy and Soviet leader Nikita S. Krushchev and was reopened in 1997 with vibrant reds and yellows depicting notable themes and figures of Austrian literature, all of Mikl's design.

Josef Mikl died of cancer on March 29, 2008. His funeral was held on April 3 though his death was not announced until the next day, in accordance with Mikl's wishes. Survivors include his wife, Brigitte Bruckner, and their 20-year-old daughter Anna Mikl.

Honours and awards
Award from the City of Vienna (1955)
City of Vienna Prize for Visual Arts, Painting and Graphics (1973)
Austrian Decoration for Science and Art (1990) 
Grand Gold Decoration for Services to the Republic of Austria (2004)
Ring of Honour of Vienna (2004)

References

External links

The Guardian: Josef Mikl, Austrian abstract artist who brought radical influences to his country after the war 
Josef Mikl on artnet

1929 births
2008 deaths
Artists from Vienna
20th-century Austrian painters
Austrian male painters
21st-century Austrian painters
21st-century male artists
Recipients of the Austrian Decoration for Science and Art
Recipients of the Grand Decoration for Services to the Republic of Austria
Austrian contemporary artists
Burials at Döbling Cemetery
20th-century Austrian male artists